Epinotia fraternana is a butterfly belonging to the family Tortricidae. The species was first described by Adrian Hardy Haworth in 1811.

The wingspan is 10–14 mm. The forewings are yellow-brown at the base, more reddish-brown further out, with two more or less clear, bright bands. The hindwings are brown and relatively narrow.

The larvae feed on Abies alba. The adult wraps fly in June-July.

It is native to Europe.

References

Eucosmini